Ablah Dzifa Gomashie is a Ghanaian female veteran actress, producer, screen scriptwriter and a politician. She was the Deputy Minister of Tourism in the National Democratic Congress (NDC) during their term in office between 2013 and 2017 when John Dramani Mahama was president. She is currently the parliamentary candidate of the NDC in the Ketu South Constituency and a queen-mother in the Aflao Traditional Area.

Education 
Gomashie was born in Accra to Mr Patrick Dotse Gomashie and Helen Gomashie. She hails from Aflao in the Volta region and was born on 25 July 1965. She had her secondary level education at St. Louis Senior High School in Kumasi and then furthered at the University of Ghana, where she acquired a diploma in Theatre Arts, a bachelor's degree in Theatre Management and an MPhil in African Studies from the Institute of African Studies.

Career 
Gomashie's career as an actress began in 1985 when she joined the Talents Theatre Company. She has featured in plays like Black Star, Mambo, Chaka the Zulu, Jogolo and The Third Woman. She has also starred in several movies including: Ghost Tears, House of Pain, Heart of Gold and a number of National Arts NAFTI student productions. She is also a script writer who wrote and produced 'By The Fire Side', a GTV programme that used story-telling to encourage children to read more and to develop their reading skills but is currently on hold due to lack of sponsors.

Aside acting, she owns a restaurant called 'Mama's Kitchen' at Ashale Botwe, which is no longer in operation.

Politics 
In 2013, she was nominated and appointed into office as the deputy Minister of Tourism, Arts & Culture by President John Dramani Mahama, a position she held until her party, the NDC lost the elections and handed over to the next government in 2017.

On 24 August 2019, she contested and won the bid to represent the Ketu South constituency on the ticket of the National Democratic Congress (NDC) in the 2020 elections. She won bid with 586 votes while the other contestants, Foga Nukunu, Joseph Nyavi and Nicholas Worklatsi lost with 555, 294 and 302 votes respectively.

Committees 
Gomashie is a member of the Poverty Reduction Strategy Committee and also a member of the Trade, Industry and Tourism Committee.

Personal life 
Gomashie was married to the late Martin K.G Ahiaglo.The couple had no child together. Dzifa had a son from a previous relationship.

Honor 
She was honored by the organizers of 3Music Awards for her achievement in the entertainment industry in Ghana.

References 

Living people
Ghanaian film actresses
21st-century Ghanaian women politicians
University of Ghana alumni
National Democratic Congress (Ghana) politicians
Ghanaian film producers
Ghanaian women film producers
Women government ministers of Ghana
Ghanaian MPs 2021–2025
Tourism ministers of Ghana
1965 births